The 1891 Cork City by-election was a parliamentary by-election held for the United Kingdom House of Commons constituency of Cork City on 6 November 1891. It arose as a result of the death of the sitting member, Charles Stewart Parnell of the Irish Parliamentary Party.

Background
In the year before the by-election, the Irish Parliamentary Party had split in two after Parnell, its leader, had been cited as co-respondent in a divorce case, causing a scandal. A majority of the party's MPs left to found an Anti-Parnellite group. Three successive by-elections showed public support favouring the Anti-Parnellites. Even with Parnell dead, the bitterness that had arisen in the course of the party split was still deep.

The campaign
The Parnellites nominated their most prominent figure, John Redmond, for the seat. As the sitting MP for North Wexford, Redmond had to resign in order to contest the by-election. The anti-Parnellites nominated Martin Flavin, a local butter merchant and member of Cork Corporation. There was also a Conservative candidate, Captain Dominick Sarsfield, a landowner, Orangeman, and descendant of Patrick Sarsfield.

Result
The Parnellites would have expected to do well in their former leader's own constituency, although the other member - this was a two-seat constituency - was Maurice Healy, a strong anti-Parnellite. In the event, the result was a big success for Flavin, who got 3,669 votes as against 2,157 for Redmond and 1,161 for Sarsfield - a majority of 1,512 (and 351 over the other two combined). Flavin only held the seat until the following year's general election, when he retired due to ill-health. Redmond was subsequently elected in a by-election in Waterford City and held the seat until his death in 1918; Dominick Sarsfield was taken ill shortly after the election and died the following February.

References

1891 elections in the United Kingdom
By-elections to the Parliament of the United Kingdom in County Cork constituencies
Elections in Cork (city)
1891 elections in Ireland